Maarconi Mathaai is a 2019 Indian Malayalam-language comedy drama film written and directed by Sanil Kalathil, who directed Uthara. The film starring Jayaram, Vijay Sethupathi and Athmiya Rajan marks Vijay Sethupathi's debut in Malayalam cinema and the 100th film appearance of actor comedian Aju Varghese. The film released on 11 July 2019, received mixed reviews. The film was dubbed in Telugu as Radio Madhav.

Plot
Mathai is an ex-soldier who is now working as a security guard in a bank. He is friendly with all and quite some time is used initially to establish his nature. He is fondly called “Marconi” as he tunes the radio signals for all in the village. Initially, we see Kunjachayan, who is shown not physically well and in bed. Mathai comes along with some of his friends and takes him for a ride. Kunjachayan enjoys it and narrates his love story with his past wife who is no more. Mathai removes the gloom by giving him some special drinks. In the bank he works, everyone likes him. Also, Sarahkunjamma is an old lady who works as a sweeper in the bank whose only happy moments come from conversations with Mathai.

Mathai's friends always force him to marry someone, but he denies it and always quotes "Life alle jeevitham". Finally upon his friends insistence he proceeds to meet a girl named Treesa. The meeting goes well, but eventually, the marriage does not happen. Parallelly, we are also introduced to actor Vijay Sethupathi, who is coming to Kerala for promoting his movie. He features in a radio call-in program as part of the movie promotions. 

After Sarahkunjamma passes away, a new girl named Anna joins in her place. She is a cute girl and wins everyone’s hearts. She is a simple, happy-go-lucky girl. One day, bank employee Antony sexually misbehaves with Anna. Mathai witness this; he warns him and Antony, shamefully apologizes, and leaves. Anna always cares for Mathai and packs him food to eat. Mathai's friends advise him to love her, to which Mathai reveals his past. In his childhood, he fell in love with another girl named Thresia, but her father disapproves this romance and beats her. Mathai gets emotionally hurt by this and decides not to be romantic, but his friends tell him to let go off the past and advise him to accept the love he has for Anna.

Mathai understand his feelings more upon listening to Sethupathi's show on the radio. One day he makes a call to the radio show and talks about his life, philosophy, and love with Sethupathi. Sethupathi also loves the way Mathai talks and affectionately calls him "Mathayiooo". On another day, Mathai musters his confidence and decides to confess to Anna about his love but fails. Finally, he decides to write a love letter, which accidentally gets into the hands of the bank employees. The bank employee Antony uses this opportunity to take revenge on Mathai and humiliates him in front of the whole bank staff. Everyone, including the bank manager, labels his moves cheap. 

Distraught by all these events, Mathai apologizes to everyone including Anna and suddenly exiles from the place. The whole villagers blame Anna for hurting Mathai, which in turn caused him to leave. Later Anna makes a call to the radio show and reveals her affection for Mathai. Sethupathi announces to everyone through the radio show to find Mathai and inform him about the love Anna has for him. He also posts on social media about this. One girl informs the radio hosts that Mathaai was last seen in Goa.

Anna later takes the help of a stranger and searches for Mathai. With help of many of his friends in Goa, they keep searching for him. The people from the radio show also try to find Mathai and get informed that he was last seen with gypsies from Greece. Everyone almost gives up on searching for Mathai, but Anna never gives up. But one day, Anna meets a homeless person, and she shares a tea with him just like how Mathai used to do. He asks her if she is Anna, and then he takes her to the gypsies. There, Anna sees something and gets fascinated.

On the conclusion of the radio show, Sethupathi gets emotional and celebrates the reunion of Mathai with Anna. Sethupathi calls him "Mathaiooo" and asks for a hug. Mathai hugs and kisses Sethupathi on the cheeks. The movie ends with a song depicting the marriage celebration of Mathai and Anna along with Sethupathi.

Cast 

 Jayaram as 'Marconi' Mathai
Al Sabith as young Mathai
 Vijay Sethupathi as himself
 Athmiya Rajan as Anna
 Shamna Kasim as Treesa
 Tini Tom as Babu
 Joy Mathew as Luckochan
 Alphy Panjikaran as Reena
 Ramesh Thilak
 Devi Ajith as Deepa
 Lakshmi Priya as Lali
 Aju Varghese as Britto
 Alencier Ley Lopez as Kunjachayan
 Sudheer Karamana as Vijayan
 Mamukkoya as Kunjikka
 Narain
 Reena Basheer as Mary
 Mukundan in a Cameo Appearance
 Anarkali Marikar as Cameo Appearance 
 Lakshmi Nakshathra as Radio Jockey, Cameo appearance
 Sidharth Siva as Cameo Appearance
 Mallika Sukumaran as Renu, Cameo Appearance
 Sharath SathyaKumar as Groom Johnny kunju

Production

Soundtrack 

The soundtrack is composed by M. Jayachandran, while the lyrics are by Anil Panachooran and B K Harinarayanan.

Reception 
The Times of India gave 2.5 out of 5 stars and wrote, "Marconi Mathai is a modern day sermon for love glossed over with fresh paint to look like a fairy tale. Minus a few sexual innuendos that over the years we've come to pardon Jayaram for, Maarconi Mathaai is a no-brainer, feel-good, family entertainer."

Deccan Chronicle rated the film 2 out of 5 and wrote, "The film is let down by a weak script and an old storyline that has been done to death. Jayaram playing a romantic lead is a little hard to digest. Athmeeya has played her role with finesse. The music is decent and the cinematography must be mentioned specially."

The Indian Express gave 1 out of 5 starts and wrote,  "Maarconi Mathaai feels like a desperate attempt to please the crowd by rehashing old tricks from the how-to-make-a-superficial-feel-good-film book."

Firstpost gave 0.5 out of 5 and wrote "Marconi Mathai has the air of being a film that thinks it is addressing crucial existential questions. Let me assure you, Mr Kalathil, it is not."

Sify  rated the movie 1.5 out of 5 and wrote "film lacks a credible script and after a while the story just meanders along without any direction."

Legacy
In August 2020, a distribution house named Rasi Media Makers bought the Tamil dubbing rights of the film and made an announcement that their first venture would be with Vijay Sethupathi. The actor later called out the studio for spreading untrue rumours about him playing the film's lead role. In early 2021, the film was dubbed and partially reshot in Tamil as Kadhal Kathai Sollava? with Nakul joining the shoot.

References

External links
 

2019 films
Indian comedy-drama films
2010s Malayalam-language films
2019 comedy-drama films